Pompeo Cesura (born c.1500–1571), also known as Pompeo Dall'Aquila or Pompeo Aquilano, was an Italian painter and engraver.  It is stated in the 'Abecedario Pittorico' by Orlandi to have been a painter of history, specializing both in oil and fresco. He flourished in the latter part of the 16th century. There is a painting by him in the church of Santo Spirito in Sassia in Rome, representing the Deposition, which was engraved by Orazio de Santis in 1572. Several frescoes by him can be viewed in his birthplace of L'Aquila, Abruzzo.

He is also said to have painted the portrait of Raphael Sanzio used at the latter's funeral.

References

Attribution:

Further reading
Raffaele Aurini, Dizionario bibliografico della gente d'Abruzzo, 2nd edition by Fausto Eugeni, Luigi Ponziani and Marcello Sgattoni, Colledara, Andromeda, 2002, vol. II, p. 48-56, first published in 5 volumes in the 1st edition and published posthumously in the 2nd edition.
Germano Boffi, Cesura Pompeo, in Gente d'Abruzzo. Dizionario biografico, Castelli, Andromeda, 2006, pp. 17–20.

External links

 Museo Nazionale d'Abruzzo biography

Year of birth unknown
Year of death unknown
16th-century Italian painters
Italian male painters
Italian Renaissance painters
People from L'Aquila
Year of birth uncertain